Mount Carmel School is a private Catholic school in Chalan Kanoa, Saipan, Northern Mariana Islands. It serves grades Pre-K to 12. It is Saipan's sole Catholic school.

It opened in 1953.

On October 24, 2018, Mount Carmel School has suffered extensive damage caused by strong winds from Typhoon Yutu.

Notable alumni 

 Benigno Fitial
 Juan Pan Guerrero
 Eloy Inos
 Felicidad Ogumoro
 Elizabeth Diaz Rechebei

References

External links
Mount Carmel School
 
Mount Carmel School Band

Private elementary schools in the United States
Private middle schools in the United States
Private high schools in the United States
Catholic elementary schools in the United States
Catholic secondary schools in the United States
Schools in the Northern Mariana Islands
High schools in the Northern Mariana Islands
Educational institutions established in 1953
1953 establishments in the Northern Mariana Islands